Pujawati Utama (4 June 1960 – 2 January 2012) was an Indonesian judoka. She competed in the women's half-heavyweight event at the 1992 Summer Olympics.

References

External links
 

1960 births
2012 deaths
Indonesian female judoka
Olympic judoka of Indonesia
Judoka at the 1992 Summer Olympics
Place of birth missing
Judoka at the 1990 Asian Games
Asian Games medalists in judo
Asian Games bronze medalists for Indonesia
Medalists at the 1990 Asian Games
20th-century Indonesian women
21st-century Indonesian women